The Czech Republic participated in the Eurovision Song Contest 2008 with the song "Have Some Fun" written by Gordon Pogoda and Stano Šimor. The song was performed by Tereza Kerndlová. The Czech broadcaster Česká televize (ČT) organised the national final Eurosong 2008 in order to select the Czech entry for the 2008 contest in Belgrade, Serbia. Ten entries competed in the national final which took place on 26 January 2008 and "Have Some Fun" performed by Tereza Kerndlová was selected as the winner entirely by a public vote.

Czech Republic was drawn to compete in the second semi-final of the Eurovision Song Contest which took place on 22 May 2008. Performing during the show in position 8, "Have Some Fun" was not announced among the 10 qualifying entries of the second semi-final and therefore did not qualify to compete in the final. It was later revealed that Czech Republic placed eighteenth out of the 19 participating countries in the semi-final with 9 points.

Background 

Prior to the 2008 Contest, Czech Republic had participated in the Eurovision Song Contest once since they debuted in the contest in 2007, of which the nation failed to qualify to the final with Kabát performing "Malá dáma" and placing 28th (last) in the semi-final achieving only one point. The Czech national broadcaster, Česká televize (ČT), broadcasts the event within Czech Republic and organises the selection process for the nation's entry. The broadcaster has used a national final to select the Czech Eurovision entry in 2007. ČT confirmed their intentions to participate at the 2008 Eurovision Song Contest in June 2007. The broadcaster later confirmed in September 2007 that the Czech entry for the 2008 contest would be selected through a national final.

Before Eurovision

Eurosong 2008 
Eurosong 2008 was the national final organised by ČT in order to select the Czech entry for the Eurovision Song Contest 2008. Ten entries participated in the competition which took place on 26 January 2008 at the Prazské Výstavište in Prague, hosted by Aleš Háma and Katerina Kristelová with the winner selected exclusively via a public vote. The show was broadcast on ČT1 as well as streamed online via the broadcaster's website ceskatelevize.cz.

Competing entries 
ČT together with a four-member jury consisting of director Libor Kodad, producer Viktor Průša, screenwriter Ivan Hubač, and screenwriter and producer Martin Hrdinka nominated ten artists for the national final, and their entries were presented to the public during a press conference on 3 January 2008. Among artists that were approached by ČT but declined to participate were singers Lucie Bílá and Jirí Korn, while among the competing artists were Gipsy.cz, L.B.P. and Sámer Issa which competed in the previous edition of Eurosong.

Final 
The final took place on 26 January 2008. Ten entries competed and the winner, "Have Some Fun" performed by Tereza Kerndlová, was determined entirely by a public vote via SMS held between 3 and 26 January 2008. In addition to the performances of the competing entries, the show was opened by singer Ewa Farna, while the band Elán which represented Slovakia in the Eurovision Song Contest 1993 performed as the interval act. Kabát, which represented Czech Republic in the Eurovision Song Contest 2007, was also featured as a guest during the show.

Promotion 
Tereza Kerndlová made several appearances across Europe to specifically promote "Have Some Fun" as the Czech Eurovision entry. On 23 February and 1 March, Tereza Kerndlová performed "Have Some Fun" during the Ukrainian and Latvian Eurovision national finals, respectively. Between 18 and 21 April, Kerndlová completed promotional activities in Malta by appearing during the One TV programmes Show Time, Bla Agenda and Trid Tarah as well as the TVM talk show programmes Il-Leyla and Ħadd Għalik.

At Eurovision
It was announced in September 2007 that the competition's format would be expanded to two semi-finals in 2008. According to the rules, all nations with the exceptions of the host country and the "Big Four" (France, Germany, Spain and the United Kingdom) are required to qualify from one of two semi-finals in order to compete for the final; the top nine songs from each semi-final as determined by televoting progress to the final, and a tenth was determined by back-up juries. The European Broadcasting Union (EBU) split up the competing countries into six different pots based on voting patterns from previous contests, with countries with favourable voting histories put into the same pot. On 28 January 2008, a special allocation draw was held which placed each country into one of the two semi-finals. Czech Republic was placed into the second semi-final, to be held on 22 May 2008. The running order for the semi-finals was decided through another draw on 17 March 2008 and Czech Republic was set to perform in position 8, following the entry from Switzerland and before the entry from Belarus.

In the Czech Republic, the semi-finals and the final were broadcast on ČT1 and featured commentary by Kateřina Kristelová. The Czech spokesperson, who announced the Czech votes during the final, was Petra Šubrtová.

Semi-final 

Tereza Kerndlová took part in technical rehearsals on 13 and 17 May, followed by dress rehearsals on 21 and 22 May. The Czech performance featured Tereza Kerndlová appearing on stage wearing a short silver dress and performing a choreographed routine with four female dancers, two of them also provided backing vocals, as well as a male DJ in the background standing on a stage construction shaped as a silver heart with wings. The LED screens displayed moving yellow elements on a dark ground and the performance also featured pyrotechnic effects. The dancers and DJ performing with Kerndlová were: Adéla Blažková, Alena Langerová, Daniela Jančichová, Veronika Krúpová and Jan Gajdoš.

At the end of the show, Czech Republic was not announced among the top 10 entries in the second semi-final and therefore failed to qualify to compete in the final. It was later revealed that Czech Republic placed 18th out of 19 in the semi-final, receiving a total of 9 points.

Voting 
Below is a breakdown of points awarded to Czech Republic and awarded by Czech Republic in the second semi-final and grand final of the contest. The nation awarded its 12 points to Ukraine in the semi-final and to Armenia in the final of the contest.

Points awarded to the Czech Republic

Points awarded by the Czech Republic

References

External links
 Eurosong

2008
Countries in the Eurovision Song Contest 2008
Eurovision